Pusaka is a collaboration of dance music producers and DJs Chris Cox of Thunderpuss and DJ Irene.  In 2001 their song "You're the Worst Thing for Me," featuring vocals by Thea Austin, hit number one on the Billboard Dance Club Songs chart.

See also
List of number-one dance hits (United States)
List of artists who reached number one on the US Dance chart

External links

References

American electronic music groups
American dance music groups